Franz Josef Jonas (4 October 1899 – 24 April 1974) was an Austrian politician who served as the President of Austria between 1965 and 1974.

He was a typesetter by profession and a member of the Social Democratic Party of Austria. After World War II, he got involved in Viennese communal politics and was mayor of Vienna from 1951 to 1965. From 1965, he was federal president and was re-elected in 1971.

Jonas was a fervent supporter of Esperanto, and starting in 1923, became a long-time instructor of the language. His address to the 1970 World Congress of Esperanto, which was held in Vienna, was delivered in Esperanto.

In 1974, he died in office, the fourth consecutive president to do so.

In Vienna, a large tram station officially called Schottentor which was built when he was mayor is colloquially named after him (Jonas-Reindl, which translates as Jonas bowl).

In 1966, Jonas was awarded the Grand Cross of The Royal Norwegian Order of St. Olav with Collar, and in 1969 the Pierre de Coubertin medal.

References 

1899 births
1974 deaths
Presidents of Austria
Mayors of Vienna
Austrian Esperantists
Austrian people of Czech descent
Politicians from Vienna
Burials at the Vienna Central Cemetery
Social Democratic Party of Austria politicians
Grand Crosses with Star and Sash of the Order of Merit of the Federal Republic of Germany
Recipients of the Grand Star of the Decoration for Services to the Republic of Austria
Honorary Knights Grand Cross of the Order of the Bath
Recipients of the Pierre de Coubertin medal